The Via Sebaste was a Roman military road in southern Anatolia. Its starting point (caput viae) was Pisidian Antioch on the central plateau, and it ran over the Taurus Mountains, through the Climax Pass (now Döşeme Boğazı) down to Perga on the coast. The Roman colonia of Comama and Apollonia lay along its route. There was an eastern branch that connected the colonia of Iconium and Lystra.

The Via Sebaste was the key to Roman control of Pisidia and its incorporation into the province of Galatia. It was completed in 6 BC by the Galatian governor Cornutus Arruntius Aquila. There are some surviving milestones. According to Acts 13:14, the early Christian missionary Paul of Tarsus took the Via Sebaste from Perga to Antioch on his first missionary journey. The road underwent major repairs twice in the Roman period. It remained in use until the 19th century.

See also
Via Domitia
Via Egnatia

Notes

Bibliography

Military roads
Roman roads in Turkey
6 BC